JJB Sports Super League IV was the official name for the year 1999's Super League championship season, the 105th season of top-level professional rugby league football in Britain, and the fourth championship run by the Super League. The start of Super League IV saw the emergence of a North East based Rugby League Club, Gateshead Thunder as well as newly promoted Wakefield Trinity Wildcats to expand the league to fourteen teams.

Rule changes
 The 40/20 rule was introduced to reward accurate kicking in general play. The rule, which had been used in Australia since 1997, gave the head and feed at the resulting scrum to a team that kicked the ball from behind their 40-metre line so that it bounced in the field of play before going into touch behind their opponent's 20 metre line.

Teams

Table

Play-offs

End of season mergers
Huddersfield managed to avoid relegation again despite finishing bottom due to the merger with Sheffield Eagles to form Huddersfield-Sheffield Giants. Also at the end of this season Gateshead Thunder and Hull Sharks were merged to form Hull F.C. with no attempt made to maintain any association with Gateshead, a new Gateshead Thunder would be formed for the 2001 Premiership season.

See also
1999 Super League Grand Final

References

External links
Super League IV at wigan.rlfans.com
Super League IV at rugbyleagueproject.com